Kimiko Date was the defending champion but did not compete that year.

Ai Sugiyama won in the final 4–6, 6–4, 6–4 against Amy Frazier.

Seeds
A champion seed is indicated in bold text while text in italics indicates the round in which that seed was eliminated. The top two seeds received a bye to the second round.

 n/a
  Kimberly Po (semifinals)
  Amy Frazier (final)
  Ai Sugiyama (champion)
  Shi-Ting Wang (quarterfinals)
  Naoko Sawamatsu (quarterfinals)
  Naoko Kijimuta (second round)
  Tamarine Tanasugarn (first round)
  Annabel Ellwood (semifinals)

Draw

Final

Section 1

Section 2

External links
 1997 Japan Open Tennis Championships Draw

Singles